Got Any Gum? is the eighth solo studio album by the American singer-songwriter Joe Walsh. It was originally released in October 1987, on the label Warner Brothers in the United States, and Full Moon in the UK, which was the last Walsh album to be released by either of those labels. The album features eight original songs which were written by Walsh with others and by himself, the album also features two covers, including the song "In My Car", which was co-written by Walsh with Ringo Starr, the former drummer for The Beatles (the song was originally released on Starr's ninth studio solo album Old Wave, in 1983). The album also features vocal contributions from J. D. Souther and Survivor's lead vocalist Jimi Jamison.

The album was received negatively by the majority of music critics, while other reviewers noted good points to the album. It was also a commercial disappointment, peaking at #113 on the Billboard 200, which marked the beginning of a downturn in Walsh's fortunes on the album charts, and ultimately led to both Warner Bros. and Full Moon dropping him from their labels. Two singles were issued from Got Any Gum?: "The Radio Song" and "In My Car". The album's first and leading single, "The Radio Song," unlike the album, was a commercial success, peaking at #8 on the Hot Mainstream Rock Tracks chart. Its music video featured the legendary DJ Wolfman Jack.

Album title
In an interview with David Letterman, on Late Night with David Letterman in October 1987, Walsh, while intoxicated, was asked about whether the album's title had a background, to which Walsh immediately responded "Yeah, a bum!, I saw a bum about a block away and I knew he was going to ask me for spare change, so I reach in - I'm all ready but he gets up to me and I say here, help yourself". He says "I don't need money, ya got any gum?"

Production and recording

Following the tepid reaction to his 1985 studio album The Confessor, Joe Walsh decided that it was time for a change of pace in his solo career. In an attempt to give his music an even more contemporary sound, he joined forces with Terry Manning as the right person to produce his new album. Manning made the list of personnel to be featured on the album, but the only other musician that Walsh knew before this time was J. D. Souther, who arranged and provided backing vocals. Beginning in early 1987, Walsh began recording Got Any Gum?, having written eight new songs with others and by himself, at Ardent Recordings and Alpha Sound, in Memphis, Tennessee.

During the making of this album, the former Barnstorm drummer, Joe Vitale introduced the prolific session musician Rick Rosas to Walsh and they became quite good friends. Under the tongue-in-cheek pseudonym "Rick the Bass Player", Rosas played bass guitar on the fifth track, "Half of the Time". After the album was finished, Rosas and Walsh went on to tour and record together, including work on three of his last solo albums, Ordinary Average Guy, Songs for a Dying Planet, and the most recent Analog Man.

Cover artwork
The album's cover photograph, which was taken by Carole Manning, is of the Memphian Theater, which first opened in 1935. In 1985, two years before the release of this album, the Memphian Theater was closed. It later became the venue for live theatre troupe "Circuit Playhouse", from which it currently takes its name. The theater is possibly best known as one of the favorite hangouts for Elvis Presley, who often rented the theater to watch the latest films with his friends and fans.

The album's back cover depicts Walsh in front of a vintage car, 1962 Ford Thunderbird while blowing up a big bubble, with gum. The album's inner sleeve photography depicts Walsh with bubble gum popped on the outside of his face while grinning. The back cover also includes a dedication to Walsh's daughter Lucy, who is also the niece of Ringo Starr.

Critical reception

James Chrispell of AllMusic retrospectively gave the album two out of five stars and wrote that "There's nothing sadder than seeing a talented artist come up with a real bummer, but that's just what this record is." adding that "Perhaps this is one of those contractual obligation albums you hear so much about." iTunes has given the album a positive review, writing, "Got Any Gum? has been widely misunderstood, mostly because it bears little resemblance to his beloved '70s output," also noting it "had spawned its own genre of decadent, heart-pumping pop-rock music."

Track listing

Personnel
Credits are adapted from the album's liner notes.

Musicians
 Joe Walsh – lead and background vocals; guitar; synthesizer; keyboards
 Terry Manning – keyboards; E-mu Emulator; piano; backing vocals
 Dave Cochran – bass guitar
 Chad Cromwell – drums; percussion

Additional musicians
 Mark Rivera – saxophone on "Half of the Time" and "No Peace in the Jungle"
 Rick Rosas (credited as "Rick the Bass Player") – bass guitar on "Half of the Time"
 Jimi Jamison – backing vocals
 J.D. Souther (credited as "John David Souther") – backing vocals

Production and artwork
 Terry Manning – producer; engineer
 Kevin Allison – production coordination
 David "Snake" Reynolds – assistant engineer
 Bob Ludwig – mastering
 Kevin Allison – equipment technician
 J.D. Souther – vocal arrangement
 Alan Wyse – synthesizer programming
 Carole Manning – art direction; photography

Sales chart performance
Album – Billboard (United States)

Singles – Billboard (United States)

See also
 List of albums released in 1987
 Joe Walsh's discography

References

External links
 

Joe Walsh albums
1987 albums
Albums produced by Terry Manning
Pop rock albums by American artists
New wave albums by American artists
Warner Records albums